The All for You Tour was the fourth concert tour by American recording artist Janet Jackson, in support of her seventh studio album All for You (2001). The show was designed by Mark Fisher and Jackson. It was originally scheduled to start in Vancouver, Canada, but due to problems transporting technical equipment across the Canada–United States border, the first show took place in Portland, Oregon. The tour trekked through North America throughout the summer and ended with a final show in Honolulu, Hawaii which was broadcast by HBO.

International dates in Europe were planned however those dates were forced to be cancelled following the September 11 attacks. According to Pollstar, the tour grossed over 48 million from 68 shows in North America between 2001 and 2002.

The tour is notable for its choreography, theatrics, and upbeat nature. Its most infamous moment is thought to be the highly controversial rendition of "Would You Mind", where Jackson selected a member of the audience and strapped them into a gurney while caressing and fondling them. The show became one of the top-grossing tours of 2001 and saw Jackson performing many of her biggest hits. The show received positive feedback from fans and critics.

Postponements and cancellations
The premiere show in Vancouver at GM Place was postponed because an integral piece of the stage set did not arrive in time for rehearsals and the planned premiere performance. According to a statement released by Orca Bay and SFX Concerts, the shipping problem was blamed on the Canada Day and Independence Day holidays. The singer had been rehearsing in Vancouver for about a week in preparation for the tour, and began officially in Portland, Oregon on July 7, 2001. The Edmonton show was also cancelled because of the stage delivery problems. The same month, a show in Milwaukee was rescheduled when Jackson chipped a tooth during rehearsals for the show and had to undergo a root canal. In early August 2001, Jackson caught a flu, which forced the postponement of shows in Cleveland, Indianapolis, and Pittsburgh. A show at New York's Madison Square Garden which was scheduled for August 21, 2001, was moved to the day before due to scheduling conflicts with the WNBA playoffs. She also rescheduled two concerts in Philadelphia and Charlotte in late August 2001, due to a recurring respiratory problem. The singer canceled a planned show in Birmingham.

Jackson was scheduled to perform a concert in Tampa, Florida on September 11, 2001. However, that night's show was postponed and rescheduled after the attacks happening on that day. The following two shows in Ft. Lauderdale were also rescheduled due to the attack. The tour resumed on September 16 in New Orleans, Louisiana. On October 1, 2001, the whole European leg was canceled, citing travel concerns for her entourage following the September 11 attacks. Jackson said in a statement: "My European fans are among the most loyal and I was very excited to share this show with them. I have agonized over this decision. Like most people, the events of Sept. 11 have troubled me enormously and I remain concerned about the foreseeable future. If anything happened to anyone on this tour, I could never forgive myself". The singer was due to play 24 dates across Europe, beginning October 31, 2001 in Stockholm and wrapping December 17 in Birmingham, England. Additionally, Jackson's planned performance at the MTV Europe Music Awards 2001, on November 8, 2001, in Frankfurt, Germany, was also canceled, with a spokesperson affirming, "She won't be coming to Europe at all [this year]". Jackson considered a return to Europe in 2002, although it did not happen.

Critical reception
Reviewing the tour's premiere concert at the Rose Garden Arena, Jennifer Van Evra of  The Vancouver Sun reported that "the Janet Jackson that crowds are catching on this tour is distinctly different from the one they might have seen in years past. Gone is the 'girl next door' version of Janet—the coy, cutesy, smiling little girl who managed to avoid the glare of the tabloids. Now 35, recently divorced, and with her new album 'All For You' in tow, Jackson is showing off a much sassier, sexier, more confident self." Pop music critic Kevin C. Johnson of the St. Louis Post-Dispatch gave a mixed review, believing the concert had similarities to her prior tour. However, he remarked: "Jackson remains one of this generation's most exciting performers in concert, easily triumphing over the likes of young upstarts Britney Spears, Christina Aguilera and Destiny's Child." Buffalo News critic Craig Seymour praised Jackson's concert at the HSBC Arena, stating that "her 'All for You' tour marked another milestone for the veteran artist, who proved to be more comfortable with own ability to command an audience than ever before." According to Seymour the best segment of the night was the "Asian-influenced set for the still-rousing 'Rhythm Nation'." He adds, "She doesn't fight against her image like Madonna, who plays almost none of her early hits during this summer's 'Drowned World' tour. Rather, she attacks her classics with such vigor that the experience is less nostalgic than vitally in-the-moment. But most of all, by embracing her well-liked hits, Jackson does precisely what a superstar is supposed to do: She lets the crowd love her."

Jim Farber of the New York Daily News wrote: "In the splashy two-hour event, which made its New York bow at Madison Square Garden last night, the suspiciously sculpted star ripped through nine costume changes, gyrated around a host of ever-changing stage sets and offered no fewer than 26 songs plucked from more than a decade's worth of hits." He criticized similarities to her previous tour, saying: "Unfortunately, the evening also recycled some Janet stunts from the past. A segment that centered on frothy cartoon characters (with Jackson appearing as a sugar plum fairy) mimicked her 1998 tour's equally infantile circus fantasia. An S&M segment, in which she strapped an audience member to a gurney and straddled him, also repeated a similar NC-17 episode from the last go-round." Sonia Murry of The Atlanta Journal-Constitution offered a positive review of Jackson's performance at the Philips Arena in comparison to other artists who were also touring at the time. She comments that while "'N Sync had some sharp moves on occasion, it was as if Jackson was plugged in she moved so much, and so well ... While Madonna offered a true visual feast, the 19,000-plus seemed to be satiated with just the art that was Jackson's sculptured body ... And where Sade may offer instant intimacy with one well-placed and throaty high note, well, Jackson did fine just to flex her thin pipes on 'Again', part of her medley of ballads ('Come Back to Me', and 'Let's Wait Awhile' included)."

Los Angeles Times pop music critic David Massey also praised Jackson's concert favorably in contrast, reporting "Madonna even in her prime was unable to move at the fast and crisp pace of Jackson. ... From the T-shirts to the tour book to the concert itself, Janet outdid the Material Girl by a mile." Massey added, "Eric Clapton sits with a guitar, year after year. Elton John sits at a piano year after year. No one presses them to dramatically alter the type of show they put on. Janet is a dance artist, and to expect something different at a Janet show is outright insane." Jackson's concert was also observed as a direct influence to Britney Spears, saying "Not only is Janet emulated by the type of show she puts on by the current teen-fab (that she made popular years ago), she still does it better than the 19-year-olds." Robert Hilburn reported that "Jackson's 'All for You' concert is tightly scripted and executed with the precision of a Broadway show—complete with flashy sets, video footage (including a probably inadvertent glimpse of the World Trade Center in one), eight dancers and even more costume changes." Los Angeles Daily News critic Sandra Barrera observed "[a]lthough her latest album, 'All for You' fueled the concert, Jackson embraced her past. As the video for 'Let's Wait Awhile' played on a giant screen, revealing a plumper Jackson falling in love amid the New York skyline, wild cheers came from the audience. She flashed back to her Marilyn Monroe-esque phase for 'Love Will Never Do', and vamped with grotesque creatures for 'Trust A Try'. She performed a medley of 'What Have You Done For Me Lately', 'Control' and 'Nasty'. And she sang 'Miss You Much', 'When I Think of You' and 'Escapade' while dressed as a whimsical insect in a "Bug's Life" sort of fantasy land."

Neva Chonin of the San Francisco Chronicle gave a positive review, stating that Jackson has been performing "for more than 28 years, but she's not slowing down. On the contrary, Jackson's tour supporting her sultry album 'All for You' is a whirling extravaganza of ever-transforming stage sets, amped-up dancing and music strong enough to rise above the furor. There are other attractions, too, such as Jackson donning dominatrix drag to simulate rites of masochistic love with a lucky audience member while singing 'Would You Mind', whose lyrics alone could make the coldest fish sweat. Have we mentioned her fabulous voice? She has a fabulous voice." Gina Vivinetto of the St. Petersburg Times, who reviewed Jackson's concert at the Ice Palace, compared it favorably to Madonna's, as "both megastars have taken wildly different paths." She comments that Madonna's "lengthy show contained precious few hits. Madonna was out to share her most recent artistic vision, whether or not you liked it" and in contrast, Jackson "sweats and shimmies and dishes out every hit she's had over a 15-year career that's bursting with them. Jackson even bunches several together in medleys so you don't go home feeling cheated." Jodi Duckett of The Morning Call stated "the reigning star of the first family of pop kept the sold-out crowd at the First Union Center on their feet for two hours while she sang, danced, vamped, acted and posed, supported by eight dancers and a five-member band, a wardrobe that clung to every nook of her chiseled body and a fluid stage set."

Recordings and broadcasts
The first three songs of the premiere concert in Portland were broadcast live on VH1 as Janet Jackson: Opening Night Live. Along with live reporting from the venue, the broadcast featured clips of Jackson's "Greatest Television Moments". Her performance of "All for You" in Charlotte was broadcast on her brother Michael Jackson's United We Stand: What More Can I Give benefit concert on October 21, 2001. The February 16, 2002 concert in Honolulu aired on HBO the following night. It was directed by David Mallet. HBO's senior vice president of original programming Nancy Geller stated, "Janet Jackson is one of today's premier entertainers, and a favorite of our subscribers. Her spectacular show continues HBO's tradition of presenting the biggest and best music". This was Jackson's second HBO concert special; the first being the broadcast of The Velvet Rope Tour. The program also featured never-before-seen footage of Jackson in her dressing room while changing into her costumes during the show. One day prior to the concert, the singer held a dress rehearsal and invited many fans who were waiting outside of the stadium inside. The dress rehearsal was also filmed, with parts being edited into the televised program. Missy Elliott also made a surprise appearance at the televised concert in Honolulu to perform during "Son of a Gun (I Betcha Think This Song Is About You)". The broadcast was watched by more than twelve million viewers, and was later released on DVD and VHS, titled Janet: Live in Hawaii.

Opening acts
112 
Ginuwine

Set list
The following set list was used for the performance in Portland, Oregon. It does not represent all concerts for the duration of the tour.

"Come On Get Up"
"You Ain't Right"
"All for You"
"Love Will Never Do (Without You)"
"Trust a Try"
"Come Back to Me" / "Let's Wait Awhile" / "Again"
"Runaway" / "Miss You Much" / "When I Think of You" / "Escapade"
"Son of a Gun (I Betcha Think This Song Is About You)"
"Got 'til It's Gone" / "That's the Way Love Goes"
"What Have You Done for Me Lately" / "Control" / "Nasty" (contains elements of "I Just Wanna Love U (Give It 2 Me)")
"Alright"
"Love Scene (Ooh Baby)" (Instrumental Interlude)
"Would You Mind"
"If" 
"Black Cat"
"Rhythm Nation" (contains excerpts from "The Knowledge")
"Doesn't Really Matter"
"Someone to Call My Lover"
"Together Again"

Tour dates

Cancelled dates

Personnel

The band
Musical director: David Barry
Drums: Brian Frasier-Moore
Keyboards: Joel Campbell and Morris Pleasure
Guitar: David Barry
Bass: Ethan Farmer
Background vocals: Julie Delgado, Jenny Douglas-McCrae, Stacey Campbell (select shows)

The dancers
Shawnette Heard (main choreographer)
Gil Duldulao, Jr. (associate choreographer)
Eddie Morales (associate choreographer)
Kelly Konno (assistant choreographer)
Jenna Dewan
Alison Faulk
David Walton
Nicholas Florez
Laurie Sposit (swing dancer)
Kevin Wilson
Luis Sanchez
Marcel Wilson (swing dancer)

Production
Set designed by Mark Fisher, Janet Jackson, Shawnette Heard
Lighting designed by Abby Rosen Holmes
Video Content Designed by Mindpool Live

References

External links
 Mark Fisher set design

Janet Jackson concert tours
2001 concert tours
2002 concert tours